Amarapura Palace was a royal palace in the old capital of Amarapura in Burma. The palace was constructed in the late 18th/early 19th century and later abandoned for Mandalay Palace. Only ruins remain of it today.

The British visitor Colesworthy Grant wrote in 1855, that the audience hall, was built by Tharrawaddy Min about the year 1838. The grounds were believed to cover a space of about quarter of a square mile. An elevated brick terrace formed the lower part. The superstructure were made out of wood and gilded.

In January 1857 Mindon seized power from his brother King Pagan, he ordered to move the Amarapura place to Mandalay.

Today the tombs of King Bodawpaya and King Bagyidaw remain, as well as parts of the old moat.

Gallery

References

External links 

Palaces in Myanmar
Amarapura
Buildings and structures in Mandalay Region